Jakub Čutta (born December 29, 1981) is a Czech ice hockey defenceman. Čutta currently plays with SaiPa in the Finnish Liiga.

He has played for the Washington Capitals of the National Hockey League.

After three seasons with HC Energie Karlovy Vary, he joined BK Mladá Boleslav in May 2011.

Career statistics

Regular season and playoffs

International

References

External links

1981 births
Living people
Czech ice hockey defencemen
HC Bílí Tygři Liberec players
HC Karlovy Vary players
Hershey Bears players
Sportspeople from Jablonec nad Nisou
Portland Pirates players
Swift Current Broncos players
Traktor Chelyabinsk players
Washington Capitals draft picks
Washington Capitals players
SaiPa players
Czech expatriate ice hockey players in Canada
Czech expatriate ice hockey players in the United States
Czech expatriate ice hockey players in Russia
Czech expatriate ice hockey players in Finland
Czech expatriate ice hockey players in Sweden